Assassin in the Limelight is a Big Finish Productions audio drama based on the long-running British science fiction television series Doctor Who.

Plot
Ford's Theatre, April 14, 1865.  The fate of the assassination of Abraham Lincoln hangs in the balance, as a result of the meddling of Doctor Robert Knox.

Cast
The Doctor — Colin Baker
Evelyn Smythe — Maggie Stables
Robert Knox — Leslie Phillips
Clara Harris — Lysette Anthony
John Parker — Eric Loren
Lizzie Williams — Madeleine Potter
Henry Clay Ford — Alan Marriott
John Wilkes Booth — Paul Dubois
Thomas Eckert — Mikey O'Connor

Notes
This play sees Leslie Phillips reprising his role as Doctor Robert Knox from Medicinal Purposes.
The aliens in this story were previously in Pier Pressure.
Eric Loren previously played Mr Diagoras and the Dalek Sec Hybrid in the Tenth Doctor story "Daleks in Manhattan"/"Evolution of the Daleks".
The sound design and music for this story is by Martin Johnson. Martin composed the music for the stage adaptations of The Evil of the Daleks (2006) and The Dalek Masterplan (2007), the latter of which involved Nicholas Briggs.
The 'limelight' of the title is a reference to the stage lighting of the era which assassin John Wilkes Booth would have been in as an actor, but is also a play on the phrase "in the limelight" being a reference to a person being the object of attention.

External links
Big Finish Productions – Assassin in the Limelight

2008 audio plays
Sixth Doctor audio plays
Fiction set in 1865